Debate has occurred throughout Europe over proposals to legalise same-sex marriage as well as same-sex civil unions. Currently 33 of the 50 countries and the 8 dependent territories in Europe recognise some type of same-sex union, among them most members of the European Union (24/27).

As of March 2023, nineteen European countries legally recognise and perform same-sex marriages: Andorra, Austria, Belgium, Denmark, Finland, France, Germany, Iceland, Ireland, Luxembourg, Malta, Netherlands, Norway, Portugal, Slovenia, Spain, Sweden, Switzerland, and the United Kingdom. An additional twelve European countries legally recognise some form of civil union, namely Croatia, Cyprus, the Czech Republic, Estonia, Greece, Hungary, Italy, Latvia, Liechtenstein, Monaco, Montenegro, and San Marino.

Poland and Slovakia recognise private contractual cohabitation of two persons (regardless of sexual orientation or relationship type - including non-sexual non-intimate relationships) for limited purposes. Although they do not recognise same-sex unions themselves, Bulgaria, Latvia, Lithuania and Romania, are bound by a ruling by the European Court of Justice to recognise same-sex marriages performed within the EU and including an EU citizen for the purposes of granting legal residence, though this ruling is not always respected in practice, as in the case of Romania which has not implemented the ruling.

Of the countries that perform same-sex marriages, some still allow civil unions, e.g. Benelux countries, France and the United Kingdom, whereas Germany, Ireland and Nordic countries have ended their pre-marriage civil union legislation so that existing unions remain but new ones are not possible.

Several European countries do not recognise any same-sex unions. Marriage is defined as a union solely between a man and a woman in the constitutions of Armenia, Belarus, Bulgaria, Croatia, Georgia, Hungary, Latvia, Lithuania, Moldova, Montenegro, Russia, Poland, Serbia, Slovakia and Ukraine. Of these, however, Croatia, Hungary, Latvia and Montenegro allow civil unions for same-sex couples.

Current situation

International level

European Court of Human Rights 
Over the years, the European Court of Human Rights (ECtHR) has handled cases that challenged the lack of legal recognition of same-sex couples in certain member states. The Court has held that the European Convention on Human Rights (ECHR) requires member states to provide legal recognition, but does not require marriage to be opened to same-sex couples.

In Schalk and Kopf v Austria (24 June 2010), the European Court of Human Rights decided that the European Convention on Human Rights does not oblige member states to legislate for or legally recognise same-sex marriages. However, the Court, for the first time, accepted same-sex relationships as a form of "family life".

In Vallianatos and Others v Greece (7 November 2013), the Court held that exclusion of same-sex couples from registering a civil union, a legal form of partnership available to opposite-sex couples, violates the convention. Greece had enacted a law in 2008 that established civil unions for opposite-sex couples only. A 2015 law extended partnership rights to same-sex couples.

Oliari and Others v Italy (21 July 2015) went further and established a positive obligation upon member states to provide legal recognition for same-sex couples. Italy thus breached the convention; it eventually implemented civil unions in 2016. The decision set a precedent for potential future cases regarding the 23 member states, certain British and Dutch territories, and the states with limited recognition (excluding Kosovo), that currently do not recognise same-sex couples' right to family life.

Chapin and Charpentier v France (9 June 2016) largely confirmed Schalk and Kopf v. Austria, holding that denying a same-sex couple access to marriage does not violate the convention. At the time of the judgment, France did allow same-sex marriage, however, the case originated from 2004, when only pacte civil de solidarité (PACS) was available to same-sex couples in France.

Fedotova and Others v. Russia (17 January 2023) ruled that states are obliged to recognize same-sex unions or civil unions. Other similar cases from other countries, including Poland, are awaiting the Tribunal. The ECHR informed the Polish government that it had accepted complaints about the lack of access for same-sex couples to marriage or civil partnerships in Poland (2020).

European Union 

Some debate occurred within the European Union about how to require member states to recognise same-sex marriages conducted in other member states, as well as any European citizens' civil unions or registered partnerships, so as to ensure the right of freedom of movement for citizens' family members.

In 2010, Romanian LGBT activist Adrian Coman and his American partner, Robert Claibourn Hamilton, married in Belgium, and subsequently attempted to relocate to Romania. Romanian authorities refused to recognise their marriage and the case progressed to the European Court of Justice. On 11 January 2018, the ECJ's advocate general, Melchior Wathelet, issued an official legal opinion stating that an EU member country cannot refuse residency rights to the same-sex spouse of an EU citizen on the grounds that it does not recognise same-sex marriage.

On 5 June 2018, the ECJ ruled in Coman's favour, stating the term "spouse" was gender-neutral, and member states are therefore obliged to recognise EU residency rights for partners of EU citizens. However, the court confirmed that it will still be up to member states whether to authorise same-sex marriage.

According to research from the European Parliament, some EU states still do not in practice grant residency to same-sex spouses, as required by Coman v. Romania. As of September 2021, Hamilton himself has not been granted residency by the Romanian government, despite the ruling. In September 2021, the European Parliament passed a resolution condemning some states failure to implement the ruling, and calling on the European Commission to ensure  rights of same-sex spouses are upheld.

National level

Partially-recognised and unrecognised states

Sub-national level

Future legislation

Marriage

Government proposals or proposals with a parliamentary majority 

 Liechtenstein: On 11 March 2022, the government introduced a bill to allow same-sex couples in registered partnerships to adopt each other's step children in accordance with a 2021 court ruling, and said future bills for full marriage equality and joint adoption would have to come from individual MPs. On 21 September 2022, a motion calling on the government to introduce a bill legalizing same-sex marriage was submitted to the Landtag by 15 out of the 25 sitting members. The motion was discussed in the plenary session on 2 November 2022, and was passed by a 23–2 vote.

Opposition proposals

 Czech Republic: A bill amending the Civil Code to allow same-sex marriage was introduced in the Chamber of Deputies on 7 June 2022. The draft was signed by one representative each from five parliamentary groups: Mayors and Independents (STAN), TOP 09, the Pirate Party, the Civic Democratic Party (ODS) and ANO.

 Greece: The opposition SYRIZA party introduced a bill to allow same-sex marriage and adoption in 2022. The government has also reportedly been studying its own draft bill for same-sex marriage, though it has not been introduced.

Non-marital partnership

Government proposals or proposals with a parliamentary majority 
 Lithuania: In May 2022, a group of MPs drafted a civil union bill which would provide limited protections for registered same-sex couples. The proposal is a compromise after a more expansive civil partnership bill was defeated in 2021. On 26 May 2022 the bill passed its first reading in the Seimas with 70 votes in favour, 49 votes against and 6 abstentions. A final vote was expected by the end of June 2022. 

 Ukraine: On 12 July 2022, a petition on same-sex marriage reached 28,000 signatures (above the 25,000 signatures needed to trigger a debate in parliament). President Volodymyr Zelenskyy stated on 2 August 2022 that while a change of the constitution, which defines marriage as union of a man and a woman, is not allowed as long as martial law is in place, he endorses the introduction of civil unions and asked his government to evaluate legal options.

Public opinion 

Public support for same-sex marriage from EU member states as measured from a 2015 poll is the greatest in the Netherlands (91%), Sweden (90%), Denmark (87%), Spain (84%), Ireland (80%), Belgium (77%), Luxembourg (75%), the United Kingdom (71%) and France (71%). In recent years, support has risen most significantly in Malta, from 18% in 2006 to 65% in 2015 and in Ireland from 41% in 2006 to 80% in 2015.

After the approval of same-sex marriage in Portugal in January 2010, 52% of the Portuguese population stated that they were in favor of the legislation. In 2008, 58% of the Norwegian voters supported same-sex marriage, which was introduced in the same year, and 31 percent were against it. In January 2013, 54.1% of Italians respondents supported same-sex marriage. In a late January 2013 survey, 77.2% of Italians respondents supported the recognition of same-sex unions. According to an Ipsos poll published in 2021, 83% of Italians were in favour of legal recognition for same-sex couples, 10% stated they were against and 7% didn't have a specific position on the issue. 59% of surveyed Italians stated they were in favour of same-sex couples jointly adopting children, while 36% were opposed.

In Greece, support more than tripled between 2006 and 2017. In 2006, 15% of Greeks said that they agreed with same-sex marriage being allowed throughout Europe, rising to 50.04% by 2017. A survey in 2020 indicated that 56% of the Greek population accept same-sex marriage.

In Ireland, a 2008 survey revealed 84% of people supported civil unions for same-sex couples (and 58% for same-sex marriage), while a 2010 survey showed 67% supported same-sex marriage by 2012 this figure had risen to 73% in support. On 22 May 2015, 62.1% of the electorate voted to enshrine same-sex marriage in the Irish constitution as equal to heterosexual marriage.

In Croatia, a poll conducted in November 2013 revealed that 59% of Croats think that marriage should be constitutionally defined as a union between a man and a woman, while 31% do not agree with the idea. In Poland, support for same sex marriages has increased from 17% in 2006 to 45% in 2019, according to Eurobarometer; other polls show a majority supporting registered partnerships.

In the European Union, support tends to be the lowest in Bulgaria, Latvia, Hungary, Romania, Slovakia, and Lithuania. The average percentage of support for same-sex marriage in the European Union as of 2006 when it had 25 members was 44%, which had descended from a previous percentage of 53%. The change was caused by more socially conservative nations joining the EU. In 2015, with 28 members, average support was at 61%.

Opinion polls

Notes

See also 

 LGBT rights in Europe
 LGBT rights in the European Union
 LGBT adoption in Europe
 Recognition of same-sex unions in Africa
 Recognition of same-sex unions in the Americas
 Recognition of same-sex unions in Asia
 Recognition of same-sex unions in Oceania

Notes

References